Snow Mountain is a mountain located in Franklin County, Maine, about  from the Canada–United States border. Snow Mtn. is flanked to the northeast by Bag Pond Mountain, and to the southeast by Round Mountain.

The north side of Snow Mountain drains into Indian Stream, then into Chain of Ponds, the North Branch of the Dead River, Flagstaff Lake, the Dead River, the Kennebec River, and into the Gulf of Maine. The southeast side of Snow Mountain drains into Little Alder Stream, then into Alder Stream, and the North Branch of the Dead River. The north side of Snow Mountain drains into Big Island Pond, then into the Kennebago River, and the Androscoggin River, which drains into Merrymeeting Bay, the estuary of the Kennebec River.

See also 
 Snow Mountain
 List of mountains in Maine
 New England Fifty Finest
 New England Hundred Highest

References

Mountains of Franklin County, Maine
New England Hundred Highest
Mountains of Maine